The 1911–12 Challenge Cup was the 16th staging of rugby league's oldest knockout competition, the Challenge Cup.

The final was contested by Dewsbury and Oldham at Headingley Rugby Stadium in Leeds.

The final was played on Saturday, 27 April 1912, where Dewsbury caused an upset to beat Oldham 8–5 at Headingley in front of a crowd of 15,271.

Dewsbury won the Challenge Cup in their first appearance in the final.

First round

Second round

Quarter-finals

Semi-finals

Final

References

External links
 Challenge Cup official website 
 Challenge Cup 1911/12 results at Rugby League Project

Challenge Cup
Challenge Cup